Electra is San Diego's tallest condominium community and was until 2014 the tallest residential high rise building in San Diego, California, United States, with a height of 144.8 meters. It comprises 43 floors and 248 rooms, and was completed in 2008. The historic San Diego Gas & Electric Company building is located in the base of the building.

See also
List of tallest buildings in San Diego

References

Residential skyscrapers in San Diego
Residential buildings completed in 2008